Tickencote Marsh is a three hectare biological Site of Special Scientific Interest west of Tickencote and Great Casterton in Rutland.

This site in the valley of the River Gwash is a base-rich grazing marsh, a habitat which is becoming increasingly rare as a result of drainage and a decline in grazing. Common flora include lesser pond-sedge, marsh horsetail and jointed rush.

The site is private land with no public access.

References

Sites of Special Scientific Interest in Rutland